Sydney-Fitzroy was an electoral district of the Legislative Assembly in the Australian state of New South Wales, created in 1894 from part of East Sydney in inner Sydney including Woolloomooloo, Potts Point and Elizabeth Bay, and bounded by Riley Street, William Street, King's Cross Road, Bayswater Road and Port Jackson. It was named after Governor FitzRoy. It was abolished in 1904 and partly replaced by Darlinghurst.

Members for Sydney-Fitzroy

Election results

References

Former electoral districts of New South Wales
Constituencies established in 1894
1894 establishments in Australia
Constituencies disestablished in 1904
1904 disestablishments in Australia